The Hardship of Miles Standish is a 1940 Merrie Melodies cartoon directed by Friz Freleng. The short was released on April 27, 1940, and features Elmer Fudd.

The title is derived from the narrative poem The Courtship of Miles Standish.

Plot
Elmer Fudd is messenger John Alden, sent to give Miles' love letter to Priscilla. While delivering the message, however, her house is attacked by Indians, and John is the only one who can save her.

Home media
 Laserdisc - The Golden Age of Looney Tunes, Volume 2, Side 9
 VHS - Elmer Fudd Cartoon Festival Featuring "An Itch in Time"

Notes
The Miles Standish character is a caricature of comic actor Hugh Herbert and the Priscilla character is a caricature of actress Edna May Oliver. The short features the voice of Arthur Q. Bryan as Elmer, who also performs the song "You Must Have Been a Beautiful Baby".
The prints of The Hardship of Miles Standish on The Golden Age of Looney Tunes LaserDisc had the 1940 ending card replaced with the 1947-48 Merrie Melodies ending card for reasons unknown. Hence no print with the original ending card has ever been released on home video.

References

External links
 
 

1940 films
American musical comedy films
Short films directed by Friz Freleng
Merrie Melodies short films
Warner Bros. Cartoons animated short films
Films based on works by Henry Wadsworth Longfellow
Films scored by Carl Stalling
1940 musical comedy films
1940s Warner Bros. animated short films